Mobarakeh is a city in Isfahan Province, Iran.

Mobarakeh or Mobarkeh or Mobarekeh may refer to:
 Mobarakeh, Qir and Karzin, Fars province
 Mobarakeh, Sepidan, Fars province
 Mobarakeh, Isfahan
 Mobarakeh, Ardestan, Isfahan province
 Mobarakeh, Tiran and Karvan, Isfahan province
 Mobarakeh, Bardsir, Kerman province
 Mobarakeh, Sirjan, Kerman province
 Mobarakeh 2, Khuzestan province
 Mobarakeh 3, Khuzestan province
 Mobarakeh, Nishapur, Razavi Khorasan province
 Mobarakeh, Bafq, Yazd province
 Mobarakeh, Marvast, Khatam County, Yazd province
 Mobarakeh, Taft, Yazd province
 Mobarakeh County, in Isfahan province
 Mobarakeh Rural District (Bafq County), Yazd province
 Mobarakeh Rural District (Marvast County), Yazd province